Alten may refer to:

 ALTEN, a French multinational company
 Alten Copper Works, Norwegian mining company
 Dessau-Alten, a district of Dessau-Roßlau, an independent city in Saxony-Anhalt, Germany

People with the name 
 Ferdinand von Alten (1885–1933), Russian-born German actor
 Bella Alten (1877–1962), operatic soprano
 Edvin Alten (1876–1967), Norwegian judge
 Ernie Alten (1894–1981), American baseball player
 Jürgen von Alten (1903–1994), German actor, screenwriter and film director
 Mathias Alten (1871–1938), German- American impressionist painter
 Rønnaug Alten (1910–2001), Norwegian actress
 Steve Alten (born 1959), American science-fiction author
 Wietse van Alten (born 1978), Dutch archer